Michael Brandasu (born 5 September 1986 in Netherlands) is a retired Dutch ice hockey player, who played most of his career as a defender for the Stavanger Oilers.

Michael Brandasu also played for Viking, the Danish club Amager Ishockey and the Dutch U20- and U18-national teams.

External links

1986 births
Dutch ice hockey defencemen
Living people
Stavanger Oilers players
Viking Hockey players